Charles Kennedy (1959–2015) was a Scottish politician and former leader of the UK Liberal Democrats.

Charles Kennedy may also refer to:

Entertainers 
Charles Napier Kennedy (1852–1898), British artist
Charles Rann Kennedy (playwright) (1871–1950), Anglo-American dramatist
Charlie Kennedy (saxophonist) (1927–2009), big band-era alto saxophonist
Charles Kennedy (1947–2005), American comedian, better known as Charles Rocket

Soldiers 
Charles Pratt Kennedy (died 1875), British army officer and founder of Shimla
Charles Thomas Kennedy (1873–1907), Scottish soldier and winner of the Victoria Cross
Charles Kennedy, 5th Marquess of Ailsa (1875–1956), Scottish peer

Sportsmen 
Charles Kennedy (cricketer) (1849–1906), English cricketer
Charles Kennedy (umpire) (1871–1911), American professional baseball umpire

Others 
Charles Kennedy (diplomat) (1831–1908), senior British diplomat
Charles Kennedy (economist) (1923–1997), Scottish economist
Charles A. Kennedy (1869–1951), U.S. Representative from Iowa 
Charles Rann Kennedy (1808–1867), English lawyer
Charles Kennedy Scott (1876–1965), English organist and choral conductor
Charles Stuart Kennedy (born 1928), oral historian of American diplomats